Carlo Donida Labati (30 October 1920, in Milan – 22 April 1998, in Porto Valtravaglia) was an Italian composer and pianist.

Carlo Donida Labati was born in Milan on 30 October 1920. He graduated in piano and composition from the Giuseppe Verdi Conservatory in Milan. Carlo Donida began his musical career as a pianist of the musical group "The Dandies". He was then hired as an arranger by Casa Ricordi, which at that time had just created a pop music section. Entered into the "songbooks," he decided to put on paper pentagramma, his first songs, with the assistance of Gian Carlo Testoni wherein the songs "Tell Me I Love You" and "Under the Almond Tree" debuted on the radio and received a warm reception from the public. Then came the binomial Donida - Pinchi that gave rise to such hits as "Vecchio Scarpone" ("Old Boot") and "Canzone da due soldi" ("Song of Two Money"), which had international success.

The long association with Giulio Rapetti Mogol, which eventually created 126 songs, began in 1960 with the song "Crumbs of Kisses" or "Briciole di baci" starring Mina and "Devil" Diavolo sung by Jimmy Fontana.

"Uno dei tanti" or "One of the Many", sung by Tony Dallara and Joe Paths, was brought to international success by Tom Jones under the title "I (Who Have Nothing)." Jones also sang "Gli occhi miei" as "Help Yourself." His songs had great success abroad. Many famous artists are indebted to Maestro Donida. Many well known singers such as Tom Jones, Ben E. King, Shirley Bassey, Chet Baker, and Charles Aznavour have interpreted many of his songs.

Donida participated in twelve editions of the Sanremo Festival. His debut in 1951 coincided with the first edition of the Festival with the song "Under the Almond" interpreted by Duo Fasano. In 1953, he participated with "Old Boot Vecchio Scarpone" starring Gino Latilla. A vocal quintet with Giorgio Consolini, won third in the standings and became an important hymn in the Alps. In 1954, he participated with "Canzone da due soldi" starring Katyna Ranieri and Achilles Togliani that ranks second.
 
One of his largest successes came in 1961 with "Al di là" on a text by Mogol, played by Betty Curtis and Luciano Tajoli's song that rose to fame in 26 countries around the world.

His career in Sanremo continued with "Abbracciami forte" (Strong hug) (1965 Udo Jurgens - Ornella Vanoni), "Gli occhi miei" (My eyes) (1968 Wilma Burgess - Dino), "La spada nel cuore" (The sword in the heart) (1970 Patty Pravo - Little Tony) and "La folle corsa" (The crowds race) (1971 Little Tony - Formula 3).

During his career, Carlo Donida composed musics and scores for documentaries, commercials, and movies. Donida established itself as a composer of songs on texts in Milanese dialect as “Mi no, ghe vegni no”, “Cing ghei de pu, ma ross” and “Quand el coeur el s’innamora” that participated and won several editions of the Song Festival Milanese. Luigi Tenco played the songs of Donida: "Serenella", "Quasi sera" (Almost evening), "Sempre la stessa storia" (Always the same story) and "Più mi innamoro di te" (The more I fall in love with you).

References

External links
Discography at Discogs.com
Premiodonida.it
Carlodonida.it

Italian male composers
Italian male pianists
1920 births
1998 deaths
20th-century pianists
20th-century Italian composers
20th-century Italian male musicians